William David Skelton  (4 September 1931 – 25 November 2016) was a top jockey in New Zealand Thoroughbred horse racing who competed from the 1940s for four decades. He also rode in Australia, South Africa, Japan, Singapore, Malaysia and Hong Kong.

Early life and family
Born in the Greymouth suburb of Cobden on 4 September 1931, Skelton was the son of William George Skelton and Gwendoline Emma Skelton (née Baker). In 1955 he married Italian-born Emanuela Valeria Macchi, and they went on to have three children, including David, who was a jockey in both Australia and New Zealand.

Bill Skelton's brother, Bob, was also a successful jockey as were his other brothers, Frank, Max, and Errol, although the latter was more noted as a top trainer for many years.

Racing career
Skelton started as an apprentice jockey aged 13, and rode his first winner (a dead heat) aged 15 at Wingatui.

He was the leading apprentice in New Zealand for four consecutive years, and champion jockey seven times, and was outside the top four of the premiership between 1947 and 1979 only four times. He rode a record 124 winners in the 1967–68 season, and in May 1980 became the first New Zealand jockey to ride 2000 winners; he finished with 2179. He remains the most successful jockey of the 20th century in New Zealand with those figures.

According to Skelton, the best horse he rode was Daryl's Joy, champion New Zealand two-year-old in 1968, champion three-year-old in Australia in 1969, and later successful in the United States. Skelton won both the W. S. Cox Plate and the Victoria Derby on Daryl's Joy in Australia.

The big two-mile victories in New Zealand included the Auckland Cup on Lucky Son, which he also trained; his father-in-law Fred Pratt's mare Foglia D'Oro in the New Zealand Cup; and Loofah and Noir Filou in the Wellington Cup.

Honours and awards
In the 1980 Queen's Birthday Honours, Skelton was appointed a Member of the Order of the British Empire, for services to horse racing as a jockey. He was inducted into the New Zealand Sports Hall of Fame in 1990, and to the New Zealand Racing Hall of Fame in 2006.

Later life and death
Skelton suffered a stroke in 1994, which restricted his movement and speech. He died in Palmerston North on 25 November 2016, aged 85.

See also

 Thoroughbred racing in New Zealand

References

External links
 Profiles of Fame: The stories of New Zealand's Greatest Sporting Achievers by Ron Palenski (2002, New Zealand Sports Hall of Fame, Dunedin) p. 42 
 Bill Skelton profile at the New Zealand Racing Hall of Fame

1931 births
2016 deaths
New Zealand jockeys
New Zealand Racing Hall of Fame inductees
New Zealand Members of the Order of the British Empire
Sportspeople from Greymouth